Radhouane Ben Ouanès (born 28 April 1980) is a Tunisian football striker.

References

1980 births
Living people
Tunisian footballers
Tunisia international footballers
US Monastir (football) players
Espérance Sportive de Tunis players
EGS Gafsa players
CS Hammam-Lif players
AS Marsa players
Stade Tunisien players
Al-Ansar FC (Medina) players
Stade Gabèsien players
Association football forwards
Tunisian Ligue Professionnelle 1 players
Saudi Professional League players
Tunisian expatriate footballers
Expatriate footballers in Saudi Arabia
Tunisian expatriate sportspeople in Saudi Arabia